Pope Clement I ( – 99 AD) was bishop of Rome in the late first century AD. He is listed by Irenaeus and Tertullian as the bishop of Rome, holding office from 88 AD to his death in 99 AD. He is considered to be the first Apostolic Father of the Church, one of the three chief ones together with Polycarp and Ignatius of Antioch.

Few details are known about Clement's life. Clement was said to have been consecrated by Peter the Apostle, and he is known to have been a leading member of the church in Rome in the late 1st century. Early church lists place him as the second or third bishop of Rome after Peter. The Liber Pontificalis states that Clement died in Greece in the third year of Emperor Trajan's reign, or 101 AD.

Clement's only genuine extant writing is his letter to the church at Corinth (1 Clement) in response to a dispute in which certain presbyters of the Corinthian church had been deposed. He asserted the authority of the presbyters as rulers of the church on the ground that the Apostles had appointed such. His letter, which is one of the oldest extant Christian documents outside the New Testament, was read in church, along with other epistles, some of which later became part of the Christian canon. These works were the first to affirm the apostolic authority of the clergy. A second epistle, 2 Clement, was once controversially attributed to Clement, although recent scholarship suggests it to be a homily by another author. In the legendary Clementine literature, Clement is the intermediary through whom the apostles teach the church.

According to tradition, Clement was imprisoned under the Emperor Trajan; during this time he is recorded to have led a ministry among fellow prisoners. Thereafter he was executed by being tied to an anchor and thrown into the sea. Clement is recognized as a saint in many Christian churches and is considered a patron saint of mariners. He is commemorated on 23 November in the Catholic Church, the Anglican Communion, and the Lutheran Church. In Eastern Orthodox Christianity his feast is kept on 24 or 25 November.

Life

The Liber Pontificalis presents a list that makes Linus the second in the line of bishops of Rome, with Peter as first; but at the same time it states that Peter ordained two bishops, Linus and Anacletus, for the priestly service of the community, devoting himself instead to prayer and preaching, and that it was to Clement that he entrusted the Church as a whole, appointing him as his successor. Tertullian considered Clement to be the immediate successor of Peter. In one of his works, Jerome listed Clement as "the fourth bishop of Rome after Peter, if indeed the second was Linus and the third Anacletus, although most of the Latins think that Clement was second after the apostle." Clement is put after Linus and Cletus/Anacletus in the earliest (c. 180) account, that of Irenaeus, who is followed by Eusebius of Caesarea.

Early succession lists name Clement as the first, second, or third successor of Peter. However, the meaning of his inclusion in these lists has been very controversial. Some believe there were presbyter-bishops as early as the 1st century, but that there is no evidence for a monarchical episcopacy in Rome at such an early date. There is also, however, no evidence of a change occurring in ecclesiastical organization in the latter half of the 2nd century, which would indicate that a new or newly-monarchical episcopacy was establishing itself.

A tradition that began in the 3rd and 4th century, has identified him as the Clement that Paul mentioned in Philippians , a fellow laborer in Christ.  While in the mid-19th century it was customary to identify him as a freedman of Titus Flavius Clemens, who was consul with his cousin, the Emperor Domitian, this identification, which no ancient sources suggest, afterwards lost support. The 2nd-century Shepherd of Hermas mentions a Clement whose office it was to communicate with other churches; most likely, this is a reference to Clement I.

A large congregation existed in Rome c. 58, when Paul wrote his Epistle to the Romans. Paul arrived in Rome c. 60 (Acts). Paul and Peter were said to have been martyred there. Nero persecuted Roman Christians after Rome burned in 64, and the congregation may have suffered further persecution under Domitian (81–96). Clement was the first of early Rome's most notable bishops. The Liber Pontificalis, which documents the reigns of popes, states that Clement had known Peter.

Clement is known for his epistle to the church in Corinth (c. 96), in which he asserts the apostolic authority of the bishops/presbyters as rulers of the church. The epistle mentions episkopoi (overseers, bishops) or presbyteroi (elders, presbyters) as the upper class of minister, served by the deacons, but, since it does not mention himself, it gives no indication of the title or titles used for Clement in Rome.

Death and legends of final days 
According to apocryphal acta dating to the 4th century at earliest, Clement was banished from Rome to the Chersonesus during the reign of the Emperor Trajan and was set to work in a stone quarry. Finding on his arrival that the prisoners were suffering from lack of water, he knelt down in prayer. Looking up, he saw a lamb on a hill, went to where the lamb had stood and struck the ground with his pickaxe, releasing a gushing stream of clear water. This miracle resulted in the conversion of large numbers of the local pagans and his fellow prisoners to Christianity. As punishment, Clement was martyred by being tied to an anchor and thrown from a boat into the Black Sea. The legend recounts that every year a miraculous ebbing of the sea revealed a divinely built shrine containing his bones. However, the oldest sources on Clement's life, Eusebius and Jerome, note nothing of his martyrdom.

The Inkerman Cave Monastery marks the supposed place of Clement's burial in Crimea. A year or two before his own death in 869, Cyril brought to Rome what he believed to be the relics of Clement, bones he found in Crimea buried with an anchor on dry land. They are now enshrined in the Basilica di San Clemente. But there are also other traditions about an ancient veneration of the relics in Chersonesus and the translation of the head to Kyiv. Other relics of Clement, including his head, are claimed by the Kyiv Monastery of the Caves in Ukraine.

Writings
The Liber Pontificalis states that Clement wrote two letters (though the second letter, 2 Clement, is no longer ascribed to him by many modern scholars).

Epistle of Clement

Clement's only extant, uncontested text is a letter to the Christian congregation in Corinth, often called the First Epistle of Clement or 1 Clement. The history of 1 Clement clearly and continuously shows Clement as the author of this letter. It is considered the earliest authentic Christian document outside the New Testament.

Clement writes to the troubled congregation in Corinth, where certain "presbyters" or "bishops" have been deposed (the class of clergy above that of deacons is argued by certain historians to be designated indifferently by the two terms). Clement calls for repentance and reinstatement of those who have been deposed, in line with maintenance of order and obedience to church authority, since the apostles established the ministry of "bishops and deacons." He mentions "offering the gifts" as one of the functions of the higher class of clergy. The epistle offers valuable insight into Church ministry at that time and into the history of the Roman Church. It was highly regarded, and was read in church at Corinth along with the Scriptures c. 170.

In the epistle, it is argued by some that Clement uses the terms "bishop" and "presbyter" interchangeably for the higher order of ministers above deacons. In some congregations, particularly in Egypt, the distinction between bishops and presbyters seems to have become established only later. But by the middle of the second century all the leading Christian centres had bishops.  Scholars such as Bart Ehrman treat as significant the fact that, of the seven letters written by Ignatius of Antioch to seven Christian churches shortly after the time of Clement, the only one that does not present the church as headed by a single bishop is that addressed to the church in Rome, although this letter did not refer to a collective priesthood either.

Clement's letter also contains historical references, it mentions persecutions of Christians, records the martyrdom of the Apostle Peter and suggests that the apostle Paul traveled to Spain.

Theology 

Clement's view on justification has had much scholarly discussion, as he is sometimes argued to have believed sola fide, though others believe him as having synergist views. Debate exists, because Clement directly stated that "we are not justified by ourselves but by faith", however in other places of the letter, he stresses judgement on sin. The Protestant scholar Tom Schreiner argued that Clement of Rome believed in a grace oriented justification by faith, which will cause the believer to do works as a result, Philip Schaff also said that Clement probably taught a faith alone doctrine while Catholic Encyclopedia wrote that Clement believed works to be part of justification. Rudolf Knopf and Rudolf Bultmann also believed that Clement believed in synergism, and that the believer needs to cooperate with the grace of God to be saved. Rudolf Knopf in his commentary on the letter of Clement to the Corinthians stated that: "Pre-Christian sins are wiped out by baptism. For those sins that follow, a person must have faith in divine mercy and, at the same time, that person must exhibit his or her own good deeds, apart from which the person cannot be saved" David Downs argued against the view that Clement of Rome holds synergist views, he argued that Clement did not write a letter about deep soteriology, but instead to provide moral guidance to the Corinthians, David Downs stated "According to the soteriological economy of Clement everything rests on the goodness, mercy, and election of the Creator, which have befitted the 'chosen portion' through Jesus".

Thomas Schreiner argued that Clement taught that faith was enough to be saved because of 1 Clement 32:4 where he stated:And so we, having been called through His will in Christ Jesus, are not justified through ourselves or through our own wisdom or understanding or piety or works which we wrought in holiness of heart, but through faith, whereby the Almighty God justified all men that have been from the beginning; to whom be the glory for ever and ever. Amen .- 1 Clement 32:4The epistle has been cited as the first work to establish Roman primacy, because he wrote to settle a problem in the church, but most scholars see the epistle as more fraternal than authoritative, and Orthodox scholar John Meyendorff sees it as connected with the Roman church's awareness of its "priority" (rather than "primacy") among local churches. It has also been argued by Dave Armstrong, that Clement supported Papal Infallibility in Letter to the Corinthians 1, 63. Because of him speaking of the Corinthians to "being obedient" to the things he has "written through the Holy Spirit" in order to correct and "root out the wicked passion of jealousy".

According to Catholic Encyclopedia, the letter of Clement has Trinitarian theology and Christ is frequently called as the high priest by him.

Writings formerly attributed to Clement

Second Epistle of Clement

The Second Epistle of Clement is a homily, or sermon, likely written in Corinth or Rome, but not by Clement. Early Christian congregations often shared homilies to be read. The homily describes Christian character and repentance. It is possible that the Church from which Clement sent his epistle had included a festal homily to share in one economical post, thus the homily became known as the Second Epistle of Clement.

While 2 Clement has been traditionally ascribed to Clement, most scholars believe that 2 Clement was written in the 2nd century based on the doctrinal themes of the text and a near match between words in 2 Clement and in the Greek Gospel of the Egyptians.

Epistles on Virginity
Two "Epistles on Virginity" were traditionally attributed to Clement, but now there exists almost universal consensus that Clement was not the author of those two epistles.

False Decretals

A 9th-century collection of church legislation known as the False Decretals, which was once attributed to Isidore of Seville, is largely composed of forgeries. All of what it presents as letters of pre-Nicene popes, beginning with Clement, are forgeries, as are some of the documents that it attributes to councils; and more than forty falsifications are found in the decretals that it gives as those of post-Nicene popes from Sylvester I (314–335) to Gregory II (715–731). The False Decretals were part of a series of falsifications of past legislation by a party in the Carolingian Empire whose principal aim was to free the church and the bishops from interference by the state and the metropolitan archbishops respectively.

Clement is included among other early Christian popes as authors of the Pseudo-Isidoran (or False) Decretals, a 9th-century forgery. These decrees and letters portray even the early popes as claiming absolute and universal authority. Clement is the earliest pope to whom a Pseudo-Isidoran text is attributed.

Clementine literature

Clement is also the hero of an early Christian romance or novel that has survived in at least two different versions, known as the Clementine literature, where he is identified with Emperor Domitian's cousin Titus Flavius Clemens. Clementine literature portrays Clement as the Apostles' means of disseminating their teachings to the Church.

Recognition as a saint

Clement's name is in the Roman Canon of the Mass. He is commemorated on 23 November as a pope and martyr in the Catholic Church as well as within the Anglican Communion and the Lutheran Church. The Syriac Orthodox Church, the Malankara Orthodox Syrian Church, the Macedonian Orthodox Church and the Greek Orthodox Church, as well as the Syriac Catholic Church, the Syro-Malankara Catholic Church and all Byzantine Rite Eastern Catholic Churches commemorate Clement of Rome (called in Syriac "Mor Clemis") on 24 November; the Russian Orthodox Church commemorates Clement on 25 November. Clement is honored in the Church of England and in the Episcopal Church on 23 November.

The St Clement's Church in Moscow is renowned for its glittering Baroque interior and iconostasis, as well as a set of gilded 18th-century railings. The parish was disbanded in 1934 and the original free-standing gate was demolished. The Lenin State Library stored its books in the building throughout the Soviet period. It was not until 2008 that the building reverted to the Russian Orthodox Church.

Clement of Rome is commemorated in the Synaxarium of the Coptic Orthodox Church of Alexandria on the 29th of the month of Hatour [25 November (Julian) – equivalent to 8 December (Gregorian) due to the current 13-day Julian–Gregorian Calendar offset]. According to the Coptic Church Synaxarium, he suffered martyrdom in AD 100 during the reign of Emperor Trajan (98–117). He was martyred by tying his neck to an anchor and casting him into the sea. The record of the 29th of the Coptic month of Hatour states that this saint was born in Rome to an honorable father whose name was Fostinus and also states that he was a member of the Roman senate and that his father educated him and taught him Greek literature.

Relics
Besides relics venerated in Rome and Kyiv (see above), 
in the city of Santa Cruz de Tenerife in Spain, the shinbone of Clement is kept. It was a gift of Sidotti, Patriarch of Antioch, to the Church of the Immaculate Conception. Historically, this was a highly revered relic in the city.

Symbolism

In workings of art, Clement can be recognized by having an anchor at his side or tied to his neck. He is most often depicted wearing papal vestments, including the pallium, and sometimes with a papal tiara but more often with a mitre. He is also sometimes shown with papal symbols such as the papal cross and the Keys of Heaven. In reference to his martyrdom, he often holds the palm of martyrdom.

Clement can be seen depicted near a fountain or spring, relating to the incident from his hagiography, or lying in a temple in the sea. The Anchored Cross or Mariner's Cross is also referred to as St. Clement's Cross, in reference to the way he was martyred.

See also
List of popes
List of Catholic saints
Pope Saint Clement I, patron saint archive
St Clement's Day

References

Notes

Citations

Sources

Further reading

Loomis, Louise Ropes (1916). The Book of Popes (Liber Pontificalis). Merchantville, NJ: Evolution Publishing. .

External links

"Saint Clement I."  Encyclopædia Britannica Online.

Two Epistles Concerning Virginity .
Opera Omnia
 Hieromartyr Clement the Pope of Rome Eastern Orthodox icon and synaxarion
Patron Saints Index: Pope Saint Clement I
Saint Clement at the Christian Iconography web site
"Here Followeth the Life of St. Clement" in the Caxton translation of the Golden Legend
 "St. Clement of Rome, Pope and Martyr (1st Century)"
Colonnade Statue in St Peter's Square

 
1st-century births
99 deaths
Year of birth unknown
Year of death uncertain
1st-century popes
1st-century Christian theologians
1st-century Romans
1st-century Christian martyrs
Burials at the Far Caves, Kyiv Pechersk Lavra
Christian slaves and freedmen
Church Fathers
Italian popes
Papal saints
People executed by drowning
Clergy from Rome
People in the Pauline epistles
Popes
Anglican saints